Moremi may refer to:
 Moremi, Botswana, a village in Botswana
 Moremi Game Reserve, a National Park in Botswana on the eastern side of the Okavango Delta
 Moremi Ajasoro, a historical princess of the Yoruba people of Nigeria
 Moremi High School, a government-run secondary school within the campus of Obafemi Awolowo University in Nigeria